Events in the year 1970 in Germany.

Incumbents
President – Gustav Heinemann 
Chancellor – Willy Brandt

Events 
 16 February – Germany in the Eurovision Song Contest 1970
 Willy Brandt (SPD), 
West German chancellor since October 1969, and GDR vice president Willi Stoph meet in Erfurt (19 March) and in Kassel (21 May) - the start of a new Ostpolitik (new eastern policy)
 26 March - the four ambassadors of the four powers meet to start negotiations about a Four Power Agreement on Berlin (which is agreed on 3 September 1971)
 26 June - 7 July – 20th Berlin International Film Festival
 12 August - the Treaty of Moscow between Western Germany and the Soviet Union is signed.
 1 September: Merger of two German transportation/maritime companies, Hamburg America Line (HAPAG) and Norddeutscher Lloyd (NDL) or North German Lloyd (NGL) to new company Hapag Lloyd
 7 December – Warschauer Kniefall

Landtag Elections 
 22 March: Bürgerschaftswahl in Hamburg 
 14 June: 
 Landtagswahl in Lower Saxony. The coalition of SPD and CDU ends; Minister President Alfred Kubel (SPD) forms his second cabinet
 Landtagswahl in North Rhine-Westphalia (the SPD-FDP-coalition keeps its majority; MP Heinz Kühn forms his second cabinet)
 Landtagswahl im Saarland: the SPD gets 27 seats and the CDU 23 seats. MP Franz-Josef Röder (CDU) forms his fourth cabinet.

Births 
15 January – Oktay Urkal, German boxer
23 January – Nicola Beer, German politician
28 January – Julia Jäger, German actress
29 January – Jörg Hoffmann, German swimmer
2 February – Anton Hofreiter, German politician
5 February – Astrid Kumbernuss, German shot putter
15 February – Jens Fiedler, German cyclist	
18 March – Matthias Maurer, German astronaut
20 March – Bernhard Hoëcker, German comedian 
18 April
 Heike Friedrich, German swimmer
 Esther Schweins, German comedian
20 April 
 Sven Benken, German footballer and manager 
 Chris Pfeiffer, German motorcycle racer and stuntman (died 2022)
25 May – Monica Lierhaus, German journalist
27 May – Bernhard, Margrave of Baden, German nobleman
7 June – Alexander Dobrindt, German politician
20 June – Andrea Nahles, German politician
6 July – Roger Cicero, German jazz and pop musician (died 2016)
25 August – Claudia Schiffer, German model
8 September – Lars Vogt, German pianist (died 2022)
6 October – Corinna May, German singer
16 October – Mehmet Scholl, German football player and manager
15 November – Uschi Disl, German biathlete

Deaths
5 January – Max Born, German physicist and mathematician (born 1882)
16 February – Carl de Vogt, German actor (born 1885)	
30 March – Heinrich Brüning, German politician, former chancellor of Germany (born 1885)	
3 April – Nikolaus, Hereditary Grand Duke of Oldenburg (born 1897)
9 May – Franz Etzel, German politician (born 1902)
12 May – Nelly Sachs, German poet and playwright (born 1891)
3 June – Hjalmar Schacht, German economist, banker, liberal politician (born 1877)
6 June – Friedrich Köchling, Wehrmacht general (born 1893)
1 August – Otto Heinrich Warburg, German physiologist, medical doctor, and Nobel laureate (born 1883)
10 August – Bernd Alois Zimmermann, German composer (born 1918)
25 September – Erich Maria Remarque, German novelist (born 1898)
3 October - Princess Victoria Adelaide of Schleswig-Holstein, Duchess of Saxe-Coburg and Gotha (born 1885)
4 November – Friedrich Kellner, German public servant and diarist (born 1885)
14 December – Franz Schlegelberger, German jurist and politician (born 1876)

References

 
Years of the 20th century in Germany
Germany
Germany